The Nanyang Institute of Technology is a full-time public undergraduate college. 

It is located in Nanyang, Henan, a famous historical and cultural city. It is the hometown of Shang Sheng Fan Yi, Ke Sheng Zhang Heng, and Zhi Sheng Zhang Zhongjing. The school insists on rooting in Nanyang, based in Henan, facing the whole country, taking the road of integration of production, education and research, and opening up the school. It is committed to the cultivation of applied talents and has been approved as one of the 100 national application-oriented undergraduate education and integration projects. Ministry of Education, Excellent Engineer Education Pilot School, National Civilized Unit, National Green Model Unit, 10 Model Application-oriented Undergraduate Colleges in Henan Province, Henan Province Overall Transformation Development Pilot School, Central Plains Economic Zone Best Service University, Henan Province Top Ten Innovative Entrepreneurship Model School, Henan Province Shuangchuang Base; has state-level space creation, education and education integration and innovation base of the Ministry of Education, engineering practice base of the Ministry of Education, provincial academician workstation, provincial postdoctoral research and development base, provincial key laboratory, and Nanyang collaborative innovation research A large number of scientific research platforms such as the hospital and Nanyang Zhongguancun. The school has 19 teaching colleges, covering nine departments of science, engineering, management, literature, economics, education, law, medicine, and art. There are more than 20,000 full-time students and students.

History

See also 
Expressways of Henan
China National Highways
Expressways of China
Henan
 Nanyang 
Wolong District
Wancheng District
 Nanyang Institute of Technology
 Nanyang Normal University
 Nanyang Medical College
 Henan Polytechnic Institute
 Nanyang Vocational College of Agriculture
 List of universities and colleges in Henan

References

External links
 Official website of Nanyang Institute of Technology (Chinese)
 Official website of Nanyang Institute of Technology (English)

Universities and colleges in Nanyang, Henan
Educational institutions established in 1912
1912 establishments in China